FK ŠKP Inter Dúbravka Bratislava was a Slovak football team, based in the town of Dúbravka, Bratislava.

History
The club was founded in 1946. The club play their home games at the 10.500 capacity Stadium ŠKP Inter Dúbravka, which they was share with FK Inter Bratislava.

In 2015, the club was dissolved due to financial problems.

Club names
 Telovýchovný klub národnej bezpečnosti Bratislava (from 1946 to 1948, TKNB)
 Sokol Sbor národnej bezpečnosti Bratislava (from 1948 to 1952, Sokol SNB)
 Sokol Červená hviezda Bratislava (from 1952 to 1953, Sokol Čh)
 Ústredný dom Červenej hviezdy Bratislava (from 1953 to 1956, ÚD Čh)
 Telovýchovná Jednota Červená hviezda Bratislava (from 1956 to 1990,  TJ Čh)
 Športový klub polície Bratislava (from 1990 to 1997, ŠKP)
 Športový klub polície Devín (from 1997 to 2003, ŠKP)
 FC Športový klub polície Dúbravka Bratislava (from 2003 to 2009, FC ŠKP)
 Športový klub polície Inter Dúbravka Bratislava (from 2009, ŠKP Inter)

Notable players
Had international caps for their respective countries. Players whose name is listed in bold represented their countries while playing for SKP.

 Csaba Horváth
 Pavol Majerník
 Kamil Susko

Notable coaches
  Vladimír Goffa (−1999)
  Koloman Gögh (2005–20??)
  Vladimír Koník (2007–2008)
  Martin Stano (2008)
  Ľubomír Bohúň (2008–2009)

References

Dubravka Bratislava
Football clubs in Bratislava
Dubravka Bratislava
Dubravka Bratislava
1946 establishments in Slovakia
2015 disestablishments in Slovakia